Irundisaua is a genus of beetles in the family Cerambycidae, containing the following species:

 Irundisaua balteata (Lane, 1972)
 Irundisaua forsteri (Tippmann, 1960)
 Irundisaua heloisae (Julio, 2003)
 Irundisaua lewisi Audureau, 2009
 Irundisaua moacyri (Julio, 2003)
 Irundisaua ocularis Martins & Galileo, 2005
 Irundisaua punctata Martins & Galileo, 2007
 Irundisaua ucayalensis (Tippmann, 1960)

References

Acanthoderini